George Frederick Cruchley (1797-1880) was an English map-maker, engraver and publisher based in London.

Selected publications
London guide: A handbook for strangers &c. London: G.F. Cruchley, 1862.

References

External links 

http://www.oldessexmaps.co.uk/gallerypubs/pubcruchley.html
Cruchley's 1827 map of London (Cruchley's New Plan Of London Improved To 1827 Including The East And West India Docks)

1797 births
1880 deaths
Publishers (people) from London
English engravers
English cartographers
19th-century English businesspeople